Paraegocera is a genus of moths of the family Noctuidae. The genus was erected by George Hampson in 1901.

The Global Lepidoptera Names Index gives this name as a synonym of Schausia Karsch, 1895.

Species
 Paraegocera confluens Weymer, 1892
 Paraegocera variata Candéze, 1927

References

Agaristinae